Artistic swimming as Synchronized swimming was contested from September 30 to October 2 at the 2002 Asian Games in Busan, South Korea. with all events taking place at the Sajik Swimming Pool. A total of 16 athletes from seven nations competed in the event, Japan won both gold medals, South Korea and China tied on the medal table with a silver and a bronze.

Schedule

Medalists

Medal table

Participating nations
A total of 16 athletes from 7 nations competed in artistic swimming at the 2002 Asian Games:

References

External links
2002 Asian Games Official Report, Pages 247–248

 
2002 Asian Games events
2002
Asian Games